The Canton of Lillers is one of the 39 cantons of the Pas-de-Calais department, in northern France. At the French canton reorganisation which came into effect in March 2015, the canton was expanded from 9 to 22 communes:

 Allouagne
 Ames
 Amettes
 Auchy-au-Bois
 Bourecq
 Burbure
 Busnes
 Calonne-sur-la-Lys
 Ecquedecques
 Ferfay
 Gonnehem
 Ham-en-Artois
 Lespesses
 Lestrem
 Lières
 Lillers (chief town)
 Mont-Bernanchon
 Norrent-Fontes
 Robecq
 Saint-Floris
 Saint-Venant 
 Westrehem

References

Lillers